Barry Stevens (born 1949) is an American technology business developer, scientist, author, speaker and entrepreneur in technology-driven enterprises; Founder of TBD America Inc., a technology business development group (1997).

Education
Stevens received his Ph.D. in inorganic chemistry from Rutgers University - Newark, an M.S. in inorganic chemistry from Rutgers University - New Brunswick, and a B.S. in science (triple major: biology, chemistry, and physics) from Fairleigh Dickinson University, where he graduated magna cum laude and valedictorian.

Career
Named in five U.S. patents, Barry Stevens' history in business, science and technology can be traced from 1978 involvement in developing the VideoDisc at RCA and CBS Records, through years at Eastman Kodak (1984–1989), receiving their Office of Innovation "Recognition Award" two years in a row (1986–1987), through current renewable energy efforts and scholarship in renewable and clean energy technologies, including involvement in biofuel development with DuBay Biofuel (DuBay Ingredients LLC) and renewable energy business development with TBD America, Inc.

Patents
 Stephen Van Noy, Robert Hambleton and Barry Stevens, Intraocular Lens Folder, US Patent No. 5,290,293 (1994).
 Graham D. Barrett and Barry Stevens, Bicomposite Intraocular Lenses, US Patent No. 5,211,662 (1993).
 F.R. Nyman, B. Stevens, and L. Ekstrom, Drying Process for VideoDiscs, US Patent No. 4,383,961 (1983).
 B. Stevens and L.R. Aldridge, Apparatus and Method for Cleaning Recorded Discs, US Patent No. 4,375,992 (1982).
 F.R. Nyman, B. Stevens, and J.A. Calamari, High Density Information Disc Processing, US Patent No. 4,327,048, (1982).

References

External links

 TBD America, Inc. website

1949 births
Living people
Rutgers University alumni
People associated with renewable energy